Richard Charles Stone (15 September 1926 – 5 June 2006) was an Australian fencer. He competed in the individual épée event at the 1956 Summer Olympics and the individual and team épée events at the 1960 Summer Olympics. In later life he was a sportsmaster at the Church of England Grammar School in Brisbane (now the Anglican Church Grammar School).

References

1926 births
2006 deaths
Australian male fencers
Olympic fencers of Australia
Fencers at the 1956 Summer Olympics
Fencers at the 1960 Summer Olympics
Sportspeople from London